The discography of Tech N9ne spans over 21 years, with the earliest official release being the single release "Cloudy-Eyed Stroll/Mitch Bade" in 1996. Tech N9ne has SoundScanned over two million albums independently. He has also had his music featured in many movies, television shows, and video games.

Albums

Studio albums 

Studio albums notes
1.  This listing combines the numbers of both the original 2001 release, Anghellic, as well as the 2003 re-release, Anghellic: Reparation. The peak position on the Independent Chart comes from the re-release, while the other positions are those of the original. As of July 29, 2009, the original release has sold 82,700 or more copies, while the re-release has sold 180,520 or more copies. The number in the table is a collective total between the two releases.

Extended plays

Compilation albums

Mixtapes

Documentaries

Singles

As lead artist

As featured artist

Other charted songs

Guest appearances

Music videos

Music videos  notes
1. This video can only be found on the Das Bus DVD.
2. This video was released on the T9X DVD in 2004, it was recorded several years prior, evident by Don Juan being present.
3. Remains unreleased in full, was released in clips of each verse through the 57th Street Rogue Dog  old official site.
4. There were two versions of this video made, the first was released normally, the second was made available through FiggKidd's forum, completely different from the first, this one having a more adult theme.
5. Footage of Tech N9ne recording in studio is used for his verse.
6. This video was made in 2007 but it was unreleased due to business disagreements between director Josiah M. Jones and Strange Music. In 2011 the music video was leaked on YouTube.

Notes

References

Hip hop discographies
Discographies of American artists